Juan Ignacio Brown (born 30 September 1977 in La Plata, Argentina) is an Argentine professional football coach and former player who is the manager of Saudi Professional League club Al-Wehda Club. He has had a short spell at Al-Hilal FC at same league in the 2017-2018 season, helping them win their 15th domestic league title. Later that summer, he left the club.

His father José Luis Brown was an Argentina international who won the 1986 FIFA World Cup.

References

External links
 

1977 births
Living people
Argentine footballers
Argentine expatriate footballers
Unión de Santa Fe footballers
Ferro Carril Oeste footballers
Estudiantes de La Plata footballers
Expatriate footballers in Bolivia
Expatriate footballers in Portugal
Association football defenders
Saudi Professional League managers
Al-Wehda Club (Mecca) managers
Al Hilal SFC managers
Argentine football managers
Footballers from La Plata